National Route 4 (officially, PY04, also known as Ruta Cuarta) is a highway in Paraguay, which runs from San Ignacio to Paso de Patria. It mainly connects two importants cities in southern Paraguay, San Ignacio and Pilar. In San Ignacio it connects with the National Route 1.

Distances, cities and towns

The following table shows the distances traversed by National Route 4 in each different department, showing cities and towns that it passes by (or near).

4